Evangelos Sarris (1881 – February 1917) was an officer of the Cretan gendarmerie and one of the leaders of the National Defence movement in Greece. 

Born in 1881 in Neapoli, Crete (province Mirabello which was at the time part of the Ottoman Empire), Sarris interrupted his studies in 1898 in order to participate in the revolution.  Despite his young age, Sarris participated in many battles.  When the French army arrived at the department of Lasithi, he enlisted as a volunteer in the gendarmerie. Since he could speak many languages as well as his native Greek, (including English, French, Italian, and Turkish), Sarris became an interpreter at the headquarters of the gendarmerie in Chania.  During this time, he also saved the life of a man who was drowning in the harbour of Chania. 

Educated through the corps, Sarris became an adjutant in 1902.  The same year, he visited the Peloponnese for the first time as commander of the music corps.  In 1907, Sarris was promoted to the rank of second lieutenant, serving as in Crete as commander of various police departments until 1912. 

In October 1912, Eleutherios Venizelos ordered the entire Cretan gendarmerie to be transported to Thessaloniki. There Sarris married Calliope Tatti, the great-granddaughter of Constantine Tattis, a member of the Filiki Eteria.  In 1913, Sarris participated in the battle to capture Bulgarian troops stationed in Thessaloniki and was decorated with the silver knight's cross of the Battalion of Saviour for his services in liberated Thessalonica. 

In 1916, along with other citizens and officers of Macedonia, Sarris took part in the creation of the Committee of National Defence.  In August 1916, as commander of the first company, he participated in the National Defence coup d’ etat that intended to spur Greece's entry in  World War I in favour of the entente powers. He died in February 1917 during an epidemic.

1881 births
1917 deaths
People from Lasithi
Greek revolutionaries